Thomas James Davis (August 13, 1952 – July 19, 2012) was an American comedian, writer, and author. He is best known for his comedy partnership with Al Franken, as half of the comedy duo "Franken & Davis" on Saturday Night Live.

Life and career
Davis was born in St. Paul, Minnesota. He attended The Blake School in Minneapolis, Minnesota, where he began his friendship and professional partnership with Al Franken. In 1975, Davis got his big break as one of the original writers for Saturday Night Live where he and Franken also performed together. The duo wrote the screenplay for and appeared in the film One More Saturday Night, and had brief appearances in Trading Places and The Rutles: All You Need Is Cash. Davis was a frequent guest on The Al Franken Show, appearing in sketches as various characters. In a well-known sketch on Saturday Night Live, he provided the voice calling into an interview with Dan Aykroyd's Jimmy Carter as the youngster that Jimmy Carter talked down from a bad trip. Davis created the SNL sketches "Theodoric of York, Medieval Barber" (with Steve Martin), "Nick The Lounge Singer" (with Bill Murray), "The Continental" (with Christopher Walken), and "Coneheads" (with Dan Aykroyd and Jane Curtin).

Illness and death
 
In 2009, Davis was diagnosed with cancer. He was treated at Mount Sinai Hospital, New York, where, on March 31, 2009, Dr. Eric Genden with minimally invasive robotic surgery, removed a tumor on Davis' right tonsil that had metastasized to an adjoining lymph node.

Davis died on July 19, 2012, of throat and neck cancer, aged 59.  He was survived by his wife, Mimi Raleigh, a veterinarian in Mount Kisco, New York, whom he married in 1991; they separated in 1999, but reconciled before his death. He was also survived by his mother, Jean Davis, and a large extended family.

Bibliography
Thirty-Nine Years of Short-Term Memory Loss (2009)
Owsley and Me: My LSD Family by Rhoney Gissen Stanley and Tom Davis (2012)

Filmography

References

External links

Tom Davis Papers. General Collection of Modern Books and Manuscripts. Beinecke Rare Book and Manuscript Library, Yale University.

1952 births
2012 deaths
Al Franken
American male comedians
American male film actors
American male screenwriters
American male television actors
American sketch comedians
American television producers
American television writers
Comedians from Minnesota
Deaths from cancer in New York (state)
Deaths from throat cancer
Primetime Emmy Award winners
Male actors from Saint Paul, Minnesota
20th-century American male actors
American male television writers
Screenwriters from Minnesota
20th-century American comedians